Thaminophyllum is a genus of South African plants in the chamomile tribe within the daisy family.

 Species
 Thaminophyllum latifolium Bond
 Thaminophyllum multiflorum Harv.
 Thaminophyllum mundtii Harv.

References

Endemic flora of South Africa
Anthemideae
Asteraceae genera